McClary is an Irish surname. Notable people with the surname include:

Andrew McClary (1730–1775), Continental Army major in the American Revolutionary War
Charles McClary (1833–1904), Canadian politician
Susan McClary (born 1946), American musicologist and professor
Thomas McClary (musician) (born 1949), American guitarist, singer, songwriter, and record producer, founder and lead guitarist of The Commodores
Thomas Calvert McClary (1909–1972), American writer of science fiction and westerns
Ty O'Neal, born Ty O'Neal McClary

See also
Clary (surname)